is an American-born Japanese actress who is represented by the talent agency GR Promotion.

Biography
Maiko was a subject to a longing scout and auditioned in the entertainment industry when she was a teenager. She received a corporate advertising audition for Shiseido and debuted in an advertisement in 2006.

Maiko's first starring role was in the film, Yama no Anata: Tokuichi no Koi, with Tsuyoshi Kusanagi in 2008. In 2010, she appeared in the NHK Taiga drama, Ryōmaden. Maiko later become the third-generationg member of Choya Umeshu's Sarari to Shita Umeshu. In 2011, she appeared in the NHK Asadora, Ohisama, and in December of the same year, her debut in stage is 8 Women.

In 2014, Maiko played Ayumi Himekawa in Glass Mask, and later appeared in many films, television series, stage shows, and advertisements.

Filmography

TV series

Films

References

External links
 Official profile 
 Profile at Esprit 

American people of Japanese descent
American emigrants to Japan
Japanese actresses
1985 births
Living people
People from Tokyo
Actresses from Seattle